The Supreme Court of Bhutan is the Kingdom of Bhutan's highest court of review and interpreter of the Constitution.

The Supreme Court consists of one Chief Justice and four Drangpons (Associate Justices). Its appellate jurisdiction is accompanied by a limited original jurisdiction on questions of such a nature and public importance that "it is expedient to obtain the opinion of the Supreme Court". The Druk Gyalpo, or King of Bhutan, may refer the question to the Supreme Court for its consideration; the Supreme Court must then hear the case and submit an opinion to the King. The Chief Justice of the Supreme Court (also called the "Chief Justice of Bhutan"), as well as its Drangpons are appointed by the Druk Gyalpo from among their juniors and peers, or from among other eminent jurists. The Chief Justice sits for a 5 year term or until reaching age 65; other Drangpons sit for 10 year terms or until reaching age 65. All Justices of the Supreme Court of Bhutan are limited to two terms. During their tenure, they are subject to by censure and suspension by command of the Druk Gyalpo on the recommendation of the National Judicial Commission for proven misbehaviour that does not rise to the level of impeachment.

The National Judicial Commission (4 persons) is chaired by the Chief Justice of Bhutan. The senior-most Drangpon of the Supreme Court also holds one position on the Commission.

Lists of Chief Justices

See also
High Court of Bhutan
Dzongkhag Court
Dungkhag Court
Constitution of Bhutan
Politics of Bhutan
Judicial system of Bhutan
Judiciary

Notes

References

External links

Judiciary of Bhutan
Bhutan
Courts in Bhutan